Darren Herewini (born 4 October 1991) is a New Zealand professional darts player who competes in events of the World Darts Federation (WDF) tournaments. He qualified for the BDO World Darts Championship for the first time in 2020.

Career
In 2017, Herewini making his PDC World Series of Darts debut qualified for the 2017 Auckland Darts Masters However, he lost to Phil Taylor 4–6 (legs).

In September 2019, Herewini qualified for the 2020 BDO World Darts Championship as the New Zealand qualifier; he played Simon Stainton in the preliminary round and won 3–1. However, he lost in the last 32 to Andy Hamilton by the same scoreline.

World Championship results

BDO
 2020: First round (lost to Andy Hamilton 1–3) (sets)

References

External links
 

Living people
New Zealand darts players
1991 births
Professional Darts Corporation associate players